Jonathan D. Green is an American musicologist, composer, and academic administrator serving as president of Susquehanna University in Selinsgrove, Pennsylvania.

Early life and education 
Green was born and raised in Upstate New York. He earned a Bachelor of Music degree from the State University of New York at Fredonia and a master's degree from the University of Massachusetts Amherst. He completed a summer seminar at Trinity College, Oxford and completed additional postgraduate work at the Chautauqua Institution before earning his Doctorate of Musical Arts in conducting from the University of North Carolina at Greensboro. During his education, Green studied under Salvatore Macchia.

Career 
Green served as dean and vice president for academic affairs at Sweet Briar College. He also worked as provost and dean of faculty at Illinois Wesleyan University. Green took office as the 15th president of Susquehanna University on July 1, 2017. Green has written eight books on musical composition and numerous articles on higher education marketing.

Awards 
In 2022, Green was named to City & State Pennsylvania magazine’s 2022 Higher Education Power 100 in recognition for his strategic leadership for "for sustainability, student recruitment, academic success and support for teaching". In 2020, Green was honored with the Arthur V. Ciervo Award by College & University Public Relations and Associated Professionals (CUPRAP) for "supporting and advancing the understanding of higher education".

References 

Susquehanna University faculty
State University of New York at Fredonia alumni
University of Massachusetts Amherst alumni
University of North Carolina at Greensboro alumni
People from New York (state)
American musicologists
American composers
American academic administrators
Sweet Briar College faculty
Illinois Wesleyan University faculty
Year of birth missing (living people)
Living people